Hvasser is a populated island and a village in Færder municipality, Norway, connected to mainland and the city of Tønsberg via the islands Brøtsø, Tjøme and Nøtterøy. The name comes from the Norwegian word "hvass", meaning sharp, which is owed to sharp cliffs on the island. The island is 3.6 km2 (1.4 sq. mi.) and the village of Hvasser is located on the center of the island. It is on the western shore of the Oslo Fjord, 25 km (15.5 mi.) south of Tønsberg. The island is a popular summer holiday destination. It is home to various hiking trails and bathing beaches. In Sandøsund is a harbor, restaurant, gallery, and general store.

Hvasser is also the pilot harbour for ships in and out the Oslo fjord. There is also a fish reception establishment.

References 

Tjøme
Islands of Vestfold og Telemark